Nasser bin Abdulaziz Al Saud (1911 – 15 September 1984) was a Saudi Arabian businessman who served as the governor of Riyadh Province from 1938 to 1951. He was a member of the House of Saud.

Early life and education
Prince Nasser was born in Qasr Al Hukm, Riyadh, in 1911. There are other reports, giving his birth date as 1913 and as 1921. He was the sixth son of King Abdulaziz. His mother was Bazza, a Moroccan woman. Prince Nasser had no full-brothers or full-sisters. He received education in Riyadh at the school of the palace, learning Quran, horsemanship and war techniques.

Riyadh governorship
In 1938, King Abdulaziz appointed him as the governor of Riyadh Province. However, he had to resign from his post due to an incident in which several foreigners died of alcohol poisoning. Upon hearing of this event, King Abdulaziz threw him in jail. He was replaced by his half-brother Sultan bin Abdulaziz in the post. Subsequently, Nasser bin Abdulaziz lost his post and never returned to public life.

Exclusion from succession and allegiances
Prince Nasser and his half-brother Prince Saad were excluded from the succession, and their younger half-brother Fahd was selected as crown prince instead in 1975. However, the supersession did not cause turmoil because both Nasser and Saad were regarded as weak contenders due to being relatively less experienced. Furthermore, Prince Nasser lost his chance to become king due to "dissolute" mores. He was regarded as unsuitable for succession by the larger family. His lack of accomplishment and low birth (his mother was a woman of colour from Morocco) were also factors leading to his exclusion.

Prince Nasser was one of two sons of King Abdulaziz who did not support the Crown Prince Faisal in his struggle with King Saud.

Personal life
One of his wives, Muhdi bint Ahmed bin Mohammed Al Sudairi, was the younger sister of his step-mother, Hussa, who was the mother of seven influential sons, known as the Sudairi Seven. Nasser and Muhdi had five sons: Prince Khalid, Prince Abdullah, Prince Fahd, Prince Turki and Prince Ahmed. His other spouse was a daughter of Abdullah bin Mutaib Al Rashid.

One of Nasser's sons, Turki, was a former military officer and the former head of the Presidency of Meteorology and Environment (PME). Another son, Mohammed bin Nasser, is the governor of Jizan Province. Mansour bin Nasser was one of King Abdullah's advisors. Yet another son, Abdulaziz bin Nasser, is a businessman and the father of Saud bin Abdulaziz, who murdered his servant in London in 2010. Abdullah bin Nasser, another son of Prince Nasser, was the president of Saudi football club Al Hilal in the 1970s.

Prince Nasser's daughter, Al Bandara, died in Riyadh in February 2017.

Later years and death
Prince Nasser could not walk and used a wheelchair in his last years. He died on 15 September 1984 and was buried in Riyadh.

Legacy
His family founded the Prince Nasser bin Abdulaziz Center for Autism, an affiliated body of the Saudi Autism Center; the center was opened in April 2012.

Ancestry

References

Nasser
1911 births
1984 deaths
Nasser
Nasser
Nasser
Nasser